Roman Bečvář (born 2 July 1966 in Louny) is a Czech former handball player who competed in the 1992 Summer Olympics.

References

1966 births
Living people
Czech male handball players
Olympic handball players of Czechoslovakia
Czechoslovak male handball players
Handball players at the 1992 Summer Olympics
People from Louny
Sportspeople from the Ústí nad Labem Region